Frederick de Horn (died 1780 or 1781) (real name Brandt) was the first husband of the painter Angelica Kauffman. According to contemporary sources, which may not be reliable, he was an imposter and bigamist who posed as a Swedish count.

Marriage to Angelica Kauffman

Brandt is chiefly known for his marriage to the Swiss painter Angelica Kauffman whom he met in London in 1766 or 1767 where she had opened a studio after arriving from the continent. The couple married at the Anglican St James's Church, Piccadilly, on 22 November 1767 in front of the Rev. Baddeley. The witnesses were Annie and Richard Horne. Sources write of a possible second ceremony at a local Catholic church but there is no evidence for it. Such a ceremony would also have been risky as the anti-Catholic penal laws were still in force which mandated execution for a Catholic priest who married two Catholics and imprisonment for the newly-weds.

A drawing of Kauffman by Nathaniel Dance (c. 1767) now in the British Museum, shows her with a wedding ring and her hand over her heart indicating love.

The couple lived apart and the relations between them quickly broke down. It was speculated in contemporary sources that the marriage was unconsummated and that Horn was impotent.

Following the breakdown of the marriage it was said that Brandt was revealed to be a bigamist who had married in Hildesheim, Hanover (now Germany), in 1765. It was also said that he used false names, calling himself Studerat in Amsterdam, Rosenkranz in Breslau, and Buckle or Burckle in Sweden. He was also said to have posed as a colonel in the army of Frederick the Great. It was said that he was the illegitimate son of Count de Horn and a maidservant Christina Brandt who had been brought up in the Count's household.

Kauffman and her father paid Horn off and he left England for the continent; the marriage was dissolved in February 1768.

Death
Brandt died in 1780, or 1781, and Kauffman soon after married Antonio Zucchi.

References

External links
https://books.google.co.uk/books?id=XherJFG-nIkC&lpg=PT99&dq=Frederick%20de%20Horn&pg=PT100#v=onepage&q=Frederick%20de%20Horn&f=false

Year of birth missing
Impostors
Angelica Kauffman
1780 deaths
Year of death uncertain